Tanjung Bungah (also spelt as Tanjong Bungah) is a suburb of George Town in Penang, Malaysia. Tanjung Bungah is well known as a beach destination, with several hotels and resorts lining the beaches within the area. Decades of urbanisation has also led to the mushrooming of residential high-rises at Tanjung Bungah.

In addition, the suburb is home to a significant expatriate population; foreigners made up 5.7% of Tanjung Bungah's population . A number of Royal Australian Air Force servicemen used to reside here while being stationed in Penang in the 1960s and 70s.

Due to its location along the northern coast of Penang Island, Tanjung Bungah was hard hit by the 2004 Indian Ocean tsunami.

Etymology 
Tanjung Bungah, which means Flower Cape in Malay, was so named due to the several smaller promontories that jut out to the sea along the cape.

History 

Tanjung Bungah was formerly a quiet fishing village populated by Malay and Chinese fishermen. It only gained prominence as a beach destination of choice for locals and tourists in the 1950s. At the time, Batu Ferringhi had yet to be developed. The crystal clear waters off Tanjung Bungah also attracted two local swimming clubs into the area – the Penang Swimming Club and the Penang Chinese Swimming Club.

The Royal Australian Air Force personnel who were stationed in Penang during the Malayan Emergency and the Indonesian Confrontation would escape to their residences at Tanjung Bungah, known as the Hillside. The spouses of the Australian servicemen also operated an amateur English language radio station – Radio RAAF – which could be tuned in throughout Penang and parts of neighbouring Kedah.

The urbanisation of Tanjung Bungah began in the 1980s, leading to the construction of numerous residential high-rises along the shoreline. The development of Tanjung Bungah has also attracted expatriates who chose to retire on Penang Island, as the suburb is located within commuting distance of George Town, the shopping malls at Tanjung Tokong and the beaches of Batu Ferringhi. Four international schools have been established here as well – Dalat International School, Prince of Wales Island International Primary School, Pelita International School and Tenby International School.

Tanjung Bungah was one of the hardest hit areas during the 2004 Indian Ocean tsunami that ultimately claimed a total of 52 lives in Penang. The Floating Mosque was subsequently built in 2005 and is now a major landmark at Tanjung Bungah.

Transportation 

The main thoroughfare within Tanjung Bungah is the coastal Tanjung Bungah Road, part of Federal Route 6. Tanjung Bungah Road continues on from Tanjung Tokong Road, cutting through the heart of the suburb until it becomes Batu Ferringhi Road near the western edge of Tanjung Bungah. Alternatively, Vale of Tempe Road, stretching along the hills further inland, is used by motorists to exit Tanjung Bungah towards the neighbouring Tanjung Tokong suburb and on to George Town, and vice versa. These handful of road connections through the suburb are also prone to traffic congestion.

Rapid Penang buses 101, 102 and 104 serve the residents of the suburb, by connecting Tanjung Bungah with George Town and other destinations on Penang Island, such as Tanjung Tokong, Batu Ferringhi, the Penang International Airport and Queensbay Mall.

Another bus service, the Hop-On Hop-Off service, caters primarily to tourists. This service, which utilises open-topped double decker buses, includes an optional stop at Flamingo Hotel within Tanjung Bungah.

In addition, a short cycling lane has been installed within Tanjung Bungah as part of the move to encourage cycling as a form of alternative transportation. At the time of its launch in 2013, it was the first dedicated cycling lane in Penang.

Education 
A total of three primary schools, two high schools, four international schools and one private college are located within Tanjung Bungah. The relatively high concentration of  international schools at Tanjung Bungah reflects the substantial expatriate population within the suburb; these schools offer either British or American curriculum up to high school diploma.

The educational institutions at Tanjung Bungah are as listed below.

Primary schools
 SRK Tanjung Bungah
 SRJK (C) Poay Wah
 SPK Persekutuan
High schools
 SMK Tanjung Bungah
 SMK Pendidikan Khas Persekutuan
International schools
 Prince of Wales Island International Primary School
Dalat International School
 Tenby International School
 Pelita International School
Private college
 Tunku Abdul Rahman University College
Aside from the aforementioned institutions, a Royal Malaysian Air Force training school is also located at Jalan Azyze. It specialises in training support and administrative personnel of the service.

Health care 
The Mount Miriam Cancer Hospital, situated at Jalan Bulan between Tanjung Bungah and Tanjung Tokong, is a private hospital that specialises in cancer treatments.

Sports 
The Penang Swimming Club at Tanjung Bungah Road, overlooking the sea, has a history stretching back to the 1900s. Originally a single-storey wooden structure, an Olympic-sized swimming pool was built in 1930. The club also initially restricted membership to Europeans; this discriminatory practice only ended in the 1940s. Today, aside from the swimming pool, the club organises regattas, sailing competitions and other aquatic sports classes for its members.

Tourist attractions 
 Penang Floating Mosque
 College General

References

Populated places in Penang
George Town, Penang